Turkish postal addresses are usually written with the name of the main street, minor street, apartment block name, apartment number, then finally Provinces of Turkey and five figure zipcode.

Abbreviations
 mah. - mahallesi (district)
 mh. - mahallesi (district)
 blv. - bulvarı (boulevard)
 cad. - caddesi (road)
 cd. - caddesi (road)
 sk. - sokak (alley)
 ap. - apartmanı (apartment)
 kat - floor. Kat 1 is 2nd floor by American method

References

Turkey